The Scarlet Honeymoon is a 1925 American silent drama film directed by Alan Hale and starring Shirley Mason, Pierre Gendron, and Allan Sears.

Cast

References

Bibliography
 Matthew Kennedy. Edmund Goulding's Dark Victory: Hollywood's Genius Bad Boy. Terrace Books, 2004.

External links

1925 films
1925 drama films
Silent American drama films
Films directed by Alan Hale
American silent feature films
1920s English-language films
Fox Film films
American black-and-white films
1920s American films